Sinbad Jr. and his Magic Belt is a series of five-minute cartoons that originally aired in first-run syndication between 1965-1966. Produced by Hanna-Barbera for the American International Television division of American International Pictures, they were shown during local children's television programming. The series is partially lost, with only a handful of surviving episodes left. Sinbad Jr. and Salty will both appear in the  HBO Max series Jellystone!

Plot
Sinbad Jr. (voiced by Dal McKennon and Tim Matheson) is the teenage son of Sinbad, the famous sailor, and he traveled the world in his single-masted sailboat seeking adventure and wrongs to right, fighting such villains as the Bluto-like, big, black-bearded Blubbo and the mad doctor Rotcoddam ("mad doctor" spelled backwards).

Sinbad Jr. gained the strength of 50 men whenever he tightened his magic belt, causing the diamond-shaped buckle to flash like lightning and temporarily transform him into a mighty muscleman.

Sinbad Jr.'s first mate was his feisty and funny feathered friend Salty the Parrot (voiced by Mel Blanc).

Production
The series was conceived by Sam Singer's production company in 1960, with Dal McKennon voicing the title role. Singer Studio produced the initial episodes for the Trans-Arts Company, but the deal fell through.

American International Pictures, which had released the film The Magic Voyage of Sinbad, held rights to the "Sinbad" trademark for screen works. AIP's television division eventually negotiated an agreement under which Hanna-Barbera would produce the series, with Tim Matheson replacing McKennon. The final release includes episodes produced by both studios.

Sinbad Jr. and His Magic Belt premiered in first-run syndication  on Sept. 11, 1965. The 102 five-minute shorts aired first-run through 1966 ran within children's television programming.

It was renamed Sinbad Jr., the Sailor out of deference to the 1962 Toei Studios feature-length cartoon, Adventures of Sinbad. The rights to the series were later acquired by MGM's subsidiary Orion Pictures (whose own holdings include the AIP library).

Theme music
The cartoon's theme song, composed by Ted Nichols, is a variation on the children's song "Sailing, Sailing (Over the Bounding Main)" that was written in 1880 by Godfrey Marks, a pseudonym of British organist and composer James Frederick Swift (1847–1931). A later version of the theme song has a jazzier beat.

Episodes
Each daily package consisted of three five-minute cartoons.

See also
 List of works produced by Hanna-Barbera Productions
 List of Hanna-Barbera characters

References

External links

1965 American television series debuts
1966 American television series endings
1960s American animated television series
American children's animated action television series
American children's animated adventure television series
American children's animated fantasy television series
Films based on Sinbad the Sailor
Television series by Hanna-Barbera
Television series by MGM Television
First-run syndicated television programs in the United States